Leucanopsis is a genus of moths in the family Erebidae. The genus was described by Alfredo Rei do Régo Barros in 1956.

Species

Leucanopsis acuta (Hampson, 1901)
Leucanopsis affinella (Strand, 1919)
Leucanopsis ahysa (Schaus, 1933)
Leucanopsis angulata (Rothschild, 1910)
Leucanopsis apicepunctata (Schaus, 1905)
Leucanopsis athor (Schaus, 1933)
Leucanopsis aurantiaca (Rothschild, 1909)
Leucanopsis aurata (E. D. Jones, 1908)
Leucanopsis austina (Schaus, 1941)
Leucanopsis azadina (Schaus, 1941)
Leucanopsis bactris (Sepp, [1852])
Leucanopsis batesi (Rothschild, 1909)
Leucanopsis biedala (Schaus, 1941)
Leucanopsis bipartita (Dognin, 1912)
Leucanopsis boliviana (Dognin, 1922)
Leucanopsis calvona (Schaus, 1941)
Leucanopsis cedon (Druce, 1897)
Leucanopsis chesteria (Schaus, 1941)
Leucanopsis cirphis (Schaus, 1911)
Leucanopsis cirphoides (Rothschild, 1916)
Leucanopsis cloisa (Schaus, 1941)
Leucanopsis coniota (Hampson, 1901)
Leucanopsis contempta (Rothschild, 1909)
Leucanopsis cuneipuncta (Rothschild, 1909)
Leucanopsis curta (Rothschild, 1910)
Leucanopsis dallipa (E. D. Jones, 1908)
Leucanopsis daltona (Schaus, 1941)
Leucanopsis democrata (Schaus, 1920)
Leucanopsis dinellii (Rothschild, 1909)
Leucanopsis dissimilis (Reich, 1935)
Leucanopsis dogniniana (Strand, 1919)
Leucanopsis ephrem (Schaus, 1905)
Leucanopsis falacra (Dognin, 1891)
Leucanopsis falacroides (Rothschild, 1909)
Leucanopsis flavorufa (Rothschild, 1910)
Leucanopsis fuscosa (E. D. Jones, 1908)
Leucanopsis goodgeri Toulgoët, 2003
Leucanopsis guascana (Schaus, 1941)
Leucanopsis hadenoides (Rothschild, 1909)
Leucanopsis hoffmannsi (Rothschild, 1909)
Leucanopsis huacina (Schaus, 1933)
Leucanopsis huaco (Schaus, 1901)
Leucanopsis infucata (Berg, 1882)
Leucanopsis ishima (Schaus, 1941)
Leucanopsis joasa (Schaus, 1941)
Leucanopsis jonesi (Rothschild, 1909)
Leucanopsis lacteogrisea (Rothschild, 1909)
Leucanopsis leucanina (Felder & Rogenhofer, 1874)
Leucanopsis lineata (Schaus, 1894)
Leucanopsis liparoides (Rothschild, 1909)
Leucanopsis loisona (Schaus, 1941)
Leucanopsis lomara (Schaus, 1941)
Leucanopsis longa (Grote, 1880) – long-streaked tussock moth
Leucanopsis louella (Schaus, 1941)
Leucanopsis lurida (H. Edwards, 1887)
Leucanopsis luridioides (Rothschild, 1917)
Leucanopsis maccessoya (Schaus, 1933)
Leucanopsis mailula (Schaus, 1927)
Leucanopsis malodonta (Dyar, 1914)
Leucanopsis manana (Schaus, 1941)
Leucanopsis mancina (Schaus, 1920)
Leucanopsis mandus (Herrich-Schäffer, [1855])
Leucanopsis marimba (Schaus, 1933)
Leucanopsis martona (Schaus, 1941)
Leucanopsis misona (Schaus, 1941)
Leucanopsis moeschleri (Rothschild, 1909)
Leucanopsis nayapana (Schaus, 1941)
Leucanopsis nebulosa (Rothschild, 1909)
Leucanopsis nimbiscripta (Dyar, 1912)
Leucanopsis nonagrioides (Rothschild, 1910)
Leucanopsis notodontina (Rothschild, 1910)
Leucanopsis nubilosus (Rothschild, 1909)
Leucanopsis oblonga (Rothschild, 1909)
Leucanopsis obvia (Dognin, 1909)
Leucanopsis ochracea (Möschler, 1883)
Leucanopsis orooca (Schaus, 1924)
Leucanopsis oruba (Schaus, 1892)
Leucanopsis oryboides (Rothschild, 1909)
Leucanopsis perdentata (Schaus, 1901)
Leucanopsis perdita (Schaus, 1920)
Leucanopsis perirrorata (Reich, 1935)
Leucanopsis pohli (Schaus, 1927)
Leucanopsis polyodonta (Hampson, 1901)
Leucanopsis potamia (Schaus, 1941)
Leucanopsis pseudoconiata (Rothschild, 1909)
Leucanopsis pseudofalacra (Rothschild, 1917)
Leucanopsis pseudomanda (Rothschild, 1910)
Leucanopsis pterostomoides (Rothschild, 1909)
Leucanopsis pulverea (Schaus, 1896)
Leucanopsis pulverulenta (Dognin, 1923)
Leucanopsis quadrata (Rothschild, 1910)
Leucanopsis quanta (Schaus, 1896)
Leucanopsis racema (Schaus, 1905)
Leucanopsis rhomboidea (Sepp, 1848)
Leucanopsis rosetta (Schaus, 1896)
Leucanopsis rufoochracea (Rothschild, 1922)
Leucanopsis sablona (Schaus, 1896)
Leucanopsis setosa (Rothschild, 1909)
Leucanopsis siegruna (Schaus, 1941)
Leucanopsis similis (Rothschild, 1909)
Leucanopsis soldina (Schaus, 1941)
Leucanopsis sporina (Schaus, 1941)
Leucanopsis squalida (Herrich-Schäffer, [1855])
Leucanopsis sthenia (Hampson, 1901)
Leucanopsis stipulata (Rothschild, 1909)
Leucanopsis stipulatoides (Rothschild, 1910)
Leucanopsis strigulosa (Walker, 1855)
Leucanopsis stuarti (Rothschild, 1909)
Leucanopsis suavina (Schaus, 1941)
Leucanopsis subnebulosa (Strand, 1919)
Leucanopsis subterranea (Rothschild, 1909)
Leucanopsis suffusa (E. D. Jones, 1908)
Leucanopsis tabernilla (Schaus, 1933)
Leucanopsis tanamo (Schaus, 1904)
Leucanopsis taperana (Schaus, 1933)
Leucanopsis terola (Schaus, 1941)
Leucanopsis terranea (Rothschild, 1909)
Leucanopsis toledana (Schaus, 1941)
Leucanopsis truncata (Rothschild, 1922)
Leucanopsis turrialba (Schaus, 1911)
Leucanopsis umbrina (Rothschild, 1910)
Leucanopsis umbrosa (Hampson, 1901)
Leucanopsis valentina (Schaus, 1924)
Leucanopsis vangetta (Dyar, 1910)
Leucanopsis velivolans (Dyar, 1920)
Leucanopsis venezuelensis (Rothschild, 1909)
Leucanopsis violascens (Reich, 1933)
Leucanopsis zacualpana (Schaus, 1941)
Leucanopsis zozinna (Schaus, 1933)

Former species

Leucanopsis atrata Toulgoët, 2003
Leucanopsis alarica (Schaus, 1941)
Leucanopsis domara (Schaus, 1941)
Leucanopsis grota (Schaus, 1941)
Leucanopsis lua (Dyar, 1910)

References

 
Phaegopterina
Moth genera